Tit-Ary (Tiit Arıı) is a rural locality (a selo), the administrative centre of and one of three settlements, in addition to Kharyyalakh and Chkalov, in Tit-Arinsky Rural Okrug of Khangalassky District in the Sakha Republic, Russia. Its population as of the 2002 Census was 418.

References

Notes

Sources
Official website of the Sakha Republic. Registry of the Administrative-Territorial Divisions of the Sakha Republic. Khangalassky District. 

Rural localities in Khangalassky District